The county of Cornwall, located in southwest England in the United Kingdom, contains numerous small rivers and streams. The border between Cornwall and the neighbouring county of Devon is mostly the River Tamar.

Notes

References

Rivers
Rivers
Cornwall